The coat of arms of Saint Helena, part of the British Overseas Territory of Saint Helena, Ascension and Tristan da Cunha, was authorised on 30 January 1984.

The arms feature a shield, with the top third showing the national bird, the Saint Helena plover (Charadrius sanctaehelenae), known locally as the wirebird – stylized, but with its unmistakable head pattern. The bottom two thirds depict a coastal scene of the island, a three-masted sailing ship with the mountainous island to the left. The coastal scene is taken from the colonial seal of the colony and shows the flag of England flying from the ship (when the shield was first introduced in 1874 the flag was a White Ensign).

The motto is Loyal and unshakable. The full coat of arms features, above the shield, a woman holding a cross and a flower. This represents Helena of Constantinople, also known as Saint Helena, after whom the island is named. The cross is shown as Helena is credited with finding the relics of the True Cross (cross upon which Jesus was crucified).

The shield of the arms features on the flag of Saint Helena and the Governor's flag. The local two pound coin has the full coat of arms on its reverse.

Arms usage by dependencies
The arms were also used by Ascension Island and Tristan da Cunha when they were dependencies of Saint Helena before 2009. Tristan da Cunha was granted its own arms in 2002 and Ascension Island was granted its own arms in 2012.

See also
Coat of arms of Saint Helena, Ascension and Tristan da Cunha
Coat of arms of Ascension Island
Coat of arms of Tristan da Cunha
List of coats of arms of the United Kingdom and dependencies

References

Saint Helena
Saint Helena
Saint Helena
Saint Helenian culture
Saint Helena
Saint Helena
Saint Helena
Saint Helena
Helena, mother of Constantine I